Evan A. Lottman (March 20, 1931 - September 25, 2001) was an American film editor. He was nominated for an Academy Award in the category Best Film Editing for the film The Exorcist. Lottman died in September 2001 of esophageal cancer at his home in Manhattan, New York, at the age of 70.

Selected filmography 
 The Exorcist (1973; co-nominated with Jordan Leondopoulos, Bud S. Smith and Norman Gay)

References

External links 

1931 births
2001 deaths
People from the Bronx
American film editors
Deaths from esophageal cancer